India Currents is, according to the San Jose Mercury News, "the oldest and largest Indian-American magazine on the West Coast" of the United States.

Fully digital today, it earlier offered Northern California, Southern California, and Washington, D.C. editions, as well as online content. In 2011 it employed 6 full-time employees and distributed 32,000 free copies. In 2015, it reached 172,000 readers every month.

It was launched in the San Francisco Bay Area in April 1987 by editor Arvind Kumar and publisher Ashok Jethanandani, with Vandana Kumar, who was editor in 2003.

India Currents and its writers have received a variety of awards, including six awards at the 2014 Greater Bay Area Journalism Awards.

References

External links
 

Asian-American magazines
Cultural magazines published in the United States
Magazines established in 1987
Magazines published in the San Francisco Bay Area
Mass media in San Jose, California
Monthly magazines published in the United States